Coombe Wood and The Lythe is a  biological Site of Special Scientific Interest west of Bordon in Hampshire. It is part of East Hampshire Hangers Special Area of Conservation  and Combe Wood is a National Trust property.

This site has woods on Wealden Upper Greensand with a rich bryophyte flora  and calcareous ground flora, especially green hellebore and violet helleborine. There are also meadows bordering a stream and an oak and hazel wood on Gault clay.

References

 
Sites of Special Scientific Interest in Hampshire